Daniel Wightman (born 5 August 1993) is a New Zealand cricketer. He played in two first-class matches for Central Districts in 2012.

See also
 List of Central Districts representative cricketers

References

External links
 

1993 births
Living people
New Zealand cricketers
Central Districts cricketers
Cricketers from Auckland